The blind goby (Typhlogobius californiensis) is a species of fish in the goby family, the only species in the genus Typhlogobius. It is native to the coastlines of southern California in the United States and Baja California in Mexico, where it commonly inhabits the burrows of shrimp of the genus Callianassa. The adult of the species is completely blind and lacks pigmentation, while the juvenile has rudimentary eyes that help it find the shrimp burrows.  This species can reach a length of  TL.

See also
Halfblind goby
Blind fish

References 

Gobionellinae
Fish of Mexican Pacific coast
Fauna of California
Monotypic fish genera
Fish described in 1881